Durga is an Indian surname. Notable people with the surname include:

 N. P. Durga, Indian politician
 S. A. K. Durga (1940–2016), Indian musicologist

Indian surnames